Andrew or Andy Morris may refer to:

Andrew Morris (mayor) (died 1594), Mayor of Galway, 1588–1589
Andrew Morris (politician) (1752–1828), American politician in New York 
Andrew Morris (gymnast) (born 1961), British Olympic gymnast
Andrew Maxwell Morris, English acoustic guitarist, pianist, and singer-songwriter
Andrew Morris (musician), Australian acoustic guitarist and singer-songwriter
Andrew Morris (organist/conductor) (born 1948), British conductor, organist, adjudicator and teacher
Andrew Morris (footballer) (born 1982), English football player for Wigan Athletic
Andrew Morris (priest) (died 1654), Dean of St Asaph
Andy Morris (boxer) (born 1983), British boxer
Andy Morris (footballer) (born 1967), English football player for Chesterfield
Sir Andrew Valentine Morris (born 1962), chief executive of Frimley Health NHS Foundation Trust

See also
 Andre Morris (born 1972), American former sprinter